Fukin may refer to
Aleksandr Fukin (born 1985), Russian futsal player
Wadi Fukin, a Palestinian village

See also 
 Fokin, a surname
 Fucking (disambiguation)